Karen T. "Kate" McCallum (born 1946) is a professional American bridge player from Exeter, New Hampshire. Sometime prior to the 2014 European and World meets (summer and October), she ranked 40th among 73 Women World Grand Masters by world masterpoints (MP) and 23rd by placing points that do not decay over time.

In world championship  competition for national women teams, McCallum played in the biennial Venice Cup tournament five times from 1989 to 2009. The 1989 team USA and 1993 team USA2 won the Cup. (From 1991 the Venice Cup field includes two U.S. representatives, the champion and runner-up called "USA1" and "USA2".)

Bridge accomplishments

Wins

 World Mixed Pairs Championship (1) 2006
 North American Bridge Championships (16)
 Smith Life Master Women's Pairs (1) 2007 
 Machlin Women's Swiss Teams (7) 1989, 1990, 1993, 1998, 2001, 2007, 2015 
 Wagar Women's Knockout Teams (3) 2003, 2008, 2010 
 Sternberg Women's Board-a-Match Teams (3) 1999, 2006, 2008 
 Chicago Mixed Board-a-Match (1) 1999 
Wagar Women's Pairs (1) 2015

Runners-up

 North American Bridge Championships
 Whitehead Women's Pairs (1) 2002 
 Machlin Women's Swiss Teams (4) 1984, 1994, 1999, 2008 
 Wagar Women's Knockout Teams (2) 1987, 2014 
 Sternberg Women's Board-a-Match Teams (1) 2002

References

External links
 

American contract bridge players
Venice Cup players
Living people
1946 births
Place of birth missing (living people)
Date of birth missing (living people)
People from Exeter, New Hampshire